The following is a list of players and who appeared in at least one game for the Milwaukee Grays franchise of the National League in 1878.



B
Charlie Bennett
Frank Bliss

C
George Creamer

D
Abner Dalrymple

E
Joe Ellick

F
Will Foley

G
Mike Golden
Jake Goodman

H
Bill Holbert

I

J
Alamazoo Jennings

K
Jake Knowdell

L

M
Dan "Pidgey" Morgan

N

O

P
John Peters

Q

R
Billy Redmond

S

T

U

V

W
Sam Weaver

X

Y

Z

External links
Baseball Reference

Major League Baseball all-time rosters
Baseball in Milwaukee